Songo Lock is the last surviving lock of the Cumberland and Oxford Canal, a 19th-century canal in southern Maine, United States.  The lock is located on the Songo River, just above its confluence with the Crooked River at the northern end of Sebago Lake State Park in the town of Naples.  The lock, built in 1830, is now used primarily during the summer months by pleasure craft.  It was listed on the National Register of Historic Places in 1970 and designated as a Maine Historic Civil Engineering Landmark by the  American Society of Civil Engineers in 2001.

Description and history
The Cumberland and Oxford Canal was conceived in the early 19th century as a means to transports raw materials and goods between the harbor of Portland, Maine and the upland interior as far north as Bridgton and Harrison on Long Lake.  The canal was completed in 1830, the year Songo Lock was finished, and operated as a commercial transport enterprise until 1870.  Songo Lock was one of the 28 locks built for the canal, and provides a major transit point between Sebago Lake and Brandy Pond, the southernmost portion of Long Lake.  The lock underwent enlargement and some modernization in 1911 by the Sebago Lake Improvement Company, which was developing the area as a summer resort destination.  It is now maintained by the state as part of Sebago Lake State Park.

The sides of the lock are granite, and its original control gates were wooden.

See also

National Register of Historic Places listings in Cumberland County, Maine

References

Transportation buildings and structures on the National Register of Historic Places in Maine
Locks on the National Register of Historic Places
Buildings and structures completed in 1830
Transportation buildings and structures in Cumberland County, Maine
National Register of Historic Places in Cumberland County, Maine
Historic district contributing properties in Maine